A Controller of Site Safety or COSS is a person qualified by the British company Network Rail to ensure safe practice for work occurring on or near rail infrastructure. Their primary role is to set up a safe system of work to protect staff from trains and trains from staff and activities.

The preferred safe systems of working where the staff are protected from line open to train movements, either by blocking some or all lines to traffic or controlling the distance the group is from the track (called Safeguarded / Fenced / Separated areas in order of consideration). This method was formerly called a Green Zone. This is the safest way of working due to the higher risks with trains moving at speed, although many incidents still happen within blocks.

Open Line working (formerly known as Red Zone) means the lines are open to train movements; this is seen as more risky than Safeguarded / Fenced / Separated areas, and is avoided in the rail industry where practicable.

The COSS is responsible for the safety of the entire group and is subject to prosecution should someone be killed or injured by their negligence.

To become a COSS someone should have served a suitable period of time on the railways and undertake a five-day course. This is then followed by a period of mentoring by an experienced COSS and then independent regular assessments to ensure that the subject is competent to undertake their role safely and effectively.

The rules around performing the role of a COSS are stated in the Rule Book  a set of documents issued to track staff detailing their duties.

A COSS is distinguishable on site by wearing a blue armlet on the left arm or upper body with white lettering the word "COSS".

Previously, the COSS was known as the Person In Charge Of Work/Possession, or PICOW/PICOP.

References

Railway safety
Railway occupations